Riki-Oh: The Story of Ricky, also known as Story of Ricky, is a 1991 Hong Kong martial arts splatter film written and directed by Lam Nai-Choi. The film is loosely based on the Japanese manga of the same name by Masahiko Takajo and Tetsuya Saruwatari. Saruwatari also co-wrote the film. The film stars Fan Siu-wong, Fan Mei-sheng (Siu-wong's real-life father), Ho Ka-kui, Gloria Yip, and Yukari Oshima.

Fan Siu-wong plays Ricky Ho Lik Wong, a young man who has super-human power and fighting abilities. Originally known in English as Story of Ricky, later releases were sold under the title Riki-Oh: The Story of Ricky. The film had a limited theatrical release in the United States in 1993. It is well known for its acting, story, extremely brutal and highly unrealistic violence, as well as its high camp factor and extremely poor English dubbing. The film is considered a cult film and has an approval rating of 89% on Rotten Tomatoes.

Plot 

By the year 2001, all correctional facilities have been privatized. Lik Wong/Ricky Ho, a martial artist, and former music student who has mysterious unexplained super human strength, is sentenced to 10 years in prison for manslaughter after killing a crime lord indirectly responsible for the death of his girlfriend Keiko/Anne after a group of thugs chased her off the building to her death after witnessing their heroin deal. It is revealed in a flashback Ricky's name as a child was Rick, but his uncle, after seeing how strong he was, decided the name Ricky was more suitable. It is also revealed that Ricky has multiple bullets inside him that he received from his attack on the crime lord, which he refused to remove because he considers them souvenirs from his killings.

An elderly inmate, Ma/Omar, is attacked by the captain of the cells Wildcat/Samuel. Ricky trips Samuel, who falls face first on a well placed piece of wood with nails. After this, one of the inmates suggests that Mad Dragon/Zorro, a dangerous, morbidly obese inmate should kill him. Omar is informed by the guards that his probation was turned down after Samuel lied, telling the guards that Omar was spreading dirty prison rumors. Stricken by grief, Omar hangs himself. Zorro attacks Ricky in the shower room, but is easily killed and gutted by Ricky's bare hands. Ricky thwarts Samuel's attack, squeezing his hands until all his fingers broke before punching a hole in his stomach, killing him as well. Ricky is thrown into isolation as punishment. At night he uses chi to heal his wounds and gets flashbacks to his girlfriend as well as his training.

Shortly after, a member of the Four Heavenly Kings ("Gang of Four" in the English dub) named Hai/Oscar the leader of the North Cell, suggests that Ricky see the one-eyed Assistant Warden Dan. The warden shoots Ricky with a gun only for Ricky to slap the bullet away and retaliate by punching the air so hard the Warden starts bleeding, which intimidates the Warden. After Ricky's confrontation, Dan suggests Oscar kill him. Outside the prison yard, Oscar and Ricky engage in a fight. After losing an eye due to a backhand slap from Ricky, Oscar cuts a hole in his stomach and uses his intestines to strangle Ricky. Ricky breaks free, tosses Oscar in the air and delivers a skull crushing blow which instantly kills Oscar. Ricky soon discovers that the Gang of Four is growing illegal opium for profit. Huang Chung/Rogan, leader of the West Cell, discovers Ricky set the poppy garden on fire, leading to a fight. Brandon, leader of the South Cell, throws needles to tie Ricky up with them, leaving him defenseless. Meanwhile, the guards report to Dan that the Warden is returning from his vacation, prompting Dan to raise the Zero Alarm, causing the defense system to shoot anyone outside their cell, regardless of status. As the fight continues, Tarzan, leader of the East Cell, arrives announcing his intent to fight Ricky but leaves along with the Gang as the Zero Alarm goes off. The Gang of Four attempt to persuade Oscar's younger brother to revenge his death, but he refuses and in return he gets half of his face sliced off.

The next day, the Warden and his spoiled obese son return from their vacation. Dan informs the Warden about the incidents, including the poppy garden. This infuriates the Warden, almost transforming him into a Hulk-like creature, though he prevents it by taking medication. As the Warden tortures and questions Ricky, Tarzan bursts through the wall to fight Ricky, which ends in Ricky dismembering half of Tarzan's left arm and breaking his mandible. The Warden activates a ceiling trap on Ricky who struggles to stay alive. Tarzan regains consciousness and holds the ceiling, only to unintentionally save Ricky by being crushed himself. After escaping, Ricky finds a photo showing Tarzan had a family waiting for him. The Warden orders the inmates to bury Ricky alive, which they reluctantly obey. The Warden proposes if Ricky survives underground for a week, he will free him. Ricky does survive by eating dog meat, however, the Warden denies him freedom. Later that night, Ricky is brought food by an inmate Freddy. Another inmate informs Dan, the prison snitch, who mortally wounds Freddy. Dan then opens Ricky's cell to taunt him with Freddy's dead body. However, Ricky breaks free , promises to kill both of them and mutilate them, and then kills the snitch by punching the top half of his head off before knocking out Dan's remaining eye. The inmates then rebel and violently ambush Dan, chopping off his arm. A prison riot team arrives with body armor and shields only for Ricky to easily punch holes in their bodies.

In the kitchen, Ricky, the prisoners, and Dan burst through the wall. The Warden shoots Dan with a homemade gas-pressured bullet, causing him to inflate and violently explode. Rogan and Brandon confront Ricky, who gravely injures Rogan by tying his limbs together. Brandon, realizing Ricky is far too powerful for him, flees from the scene, but not before the Warden shoots and kills him. The Warden attempts to shoot Ricky but remembers that Ricky is immune to bullets, even his own homemade gas-pressured bullets. The Warden, revealing that he too, is a martial artist who also went to the same school as Ricky, loses control and finally transforms into the grotesque Hulk-like creature and battles Ricky in a fist fight instead. The fight ends with Ricky crippling and throwing the mutated Warden into a meat grinder, turning him into ground beef. Outside, the prisoners rebel once again and start to attack the guards until Ricky reaches the prison wall, throwing the warden's mutated head at the frightened guards, and breaking the wall with a punch. Ricky declares to all the prisoners, "You're all free now," allowing the prisoners and himself to go free. Ricky steps out of prison and walks alone into the distance.

Cast

Production

Casting
Fan Siu-Wong was an up coming martial artist slowing gaining attention in Mainland China and Hong Kong when he was approached by Golden Harvest after finishing filming "Stone Age Warrior." He claims he was picked up at the airport by Golden Harvest and immediately offered the main role in "Story of Ricky." Fan Siu-Wong signed up for the role before researching his parts, eventually finding out it was being adapted from an ultra violent Japanese anime, in which he was then shocked by the sheer violence and brutality of the anime. He initially was very nervous that nobody will like the film because of the blood and disgusting violence. Fan Siu-Wong eventually said the role of Ricky is still one of his most memorable and people in rural areas in China will often come up to him and talk to him about the movie and say stuff like "You were in "Story of Ricky" right?" He then says the violence is the ultimately the main reason why people still remembers the movie and why it is a cult hit among fans.

Style

The plot closely follows the events depicted in the original Japanese manga and its anime adaptation, with some minor modifications in certain instances.

The film is notorious for its excessive use of graphic violence and gore, primarily due to the fact that the lead character is practically invincible, has impossibly great strength and can virtually withstand all pain, which is partially explained by Ricky being a practitioner of a superhuman form of qigong. This leads to attempts by other characters to subdue him which end up being extremely gory and over-the-top.

Aside from the aforementioned head crushing and meat grinding scenes, most notable is a fight scene between Ricky and a knife-wielding prisoner named Oscar. During the fight, Oscar throws powdered glass in Ricky's eyes and then slashes Ricky's right arm. Ricky seemingly finished, smashes a water pipe and cleans his eyes, then uses his teeth and left hand to tie the veins and tendons in his arm back together. Oscar then charges at Ricky, but Ricky dodges and smacks him in the back of the head, popping one of his eyes out, leaving it to be eaten by crows. Seeing himself at a disadvantage, Oscar attempts suicide by seppuku. However, when Ricky approaches Oscar to try and stop the suicide, Oscar grabs his own intestines and wraps them around Ricky's neck in an attempt to strangle him, prompting the assistant warden to exclaim in the English dub: "You've got a lot of guts, Oscar!". Ricky then punches Oscar in the face, with an X-ray image showing the front of his skull shattering. The deceased Oscar crumples to the ground without so much as a visibly broken nose.

In another fight scene, Ricky punches and graphically breaks the Gang of Four member, Tarzan's arm, then lands an uppercut with such force that Tarzan's jaw is torn off. Finally, Ricky goes for the Coup de grâce and punches several of Tarzan's fingers off as he attempts to punch Ricky.

Another scene includes the warden's graphic death which depicts Ricky throwing him into an industrial meat grinder. Ricky pushes the struggling warden through the grinder, until his whole body is shredded and only his head remains. In that scene, so much fake blood was used that Fan Siu-wong could not wash the blood off his skin for three days.

The film's low budget shows in the scene where Ricky's girlfriend Keiko jumps to her death. For this scene, an obvious mannequin wearing her clothes is thrown off the top of the building, landing with a dull thud and a slight bounce. A dummy is also used in some scenes where there is a close up.

Reception

Box office
Riki-Oh received a Category III rating (viewers under 18 not allowed). It was one of the first Hong Kong movies to receive such a rating for non-erotic content. This rating greatly inhibited the film's ability to make money at the box office. The film grossed $2,147,778 HKD in Hong Kong. Despite the box office performance, Fan Siu Wong said that the movie was a major hit on rental since many kids who were not allowed to view it in theaters could now rent the film and watch it.

Critical response
On the aggregator site Rotten Tomatoes, Riki-Oh has an approval rating of 89% by 9 reviews, and with an average rating of 7.1/10. Michael Atkinson of The Village Voice called it "a rather astonishing, starkly stylized blood flood set inside a privatized prison." Kurt Ramschissel of Film Threat gave the film 5 stars, saying that "the violence comes fast and furious and is just as outrageous and over-the-top as Sam Raimi or Peter Jackson ever were." J.R. Jones from the Chicago Reader said, "If you can handle the torrent of grisly violence, you'll find yourself royally entertained by this Hong Kong actioner."

Home media
In the U.S., Tokyo Shock released it on a bare bones DVD in 2000. In 2002, DVD was released by Hong Kong Legends in Region 2. In 2003, Fortune Star (formerly Mega Star), current holders of the Golden Harvest library from Media Asia, released a Remastered version of the film on a 3 disc set along with The Dragon from Russia and City Hunter.

The film was released on Blu-ray by Media Blasters in 2011. Riki-Oh: The Story of Ricky became available in its original Chinese with hard-coded English subtitles on Netflix's Instant Streaming service in mid-2012. The film aired on Turner Classic Movies on 2 November 2012 and 14 April 2013 as part of TCM Underground. In the UK, the film was first released on Blu-ray from a new HD restoration by Mediumrare Entertainment in 2015 before going out of print. In 2021, British distributors 88 Films released their own Blu-ray edition of the film with new remastered English subtitles and both Cantonese and English audio tracks.

Unofficial sequel
An unofficial sequel titled Dint King Inside King ( Story of Ricky 2 or Super Powerful Man) was released in Hong Kong in 2005. The film was never released in the United States or in Europe. Fan Siu-wong is again cast in the title role, and wears the camouflage poncho seen in flashbacks and in the manga.

References

External links

Riki-Oh 2 at Hong Kong Cinemagic

1991 films
1991 martial arts films
1990s black comedy films
1990s prison films
1990s science fiction films
1990s Cantonese-language films
1990s dystopian films
Films about giants
Films about miscarriage of justice
Films about suicide
Films about the illegal drug trade
Films set in 2001
Films set in the future
Golden Harvest films
Hong Kong films about revenge
Hong Kong martial arts films
Hong Kong prison films
Live-action films based on manga
Obscenity controversies in film
Hong Kong splatter films
Tokyo Shock
1990s Hong Kong films

ja:力王#力王 RIKI-OH STORY OF RICKY